The Donguz is a river in Orenburg Oblast, Russia, left tributary of Ural River.

The settlement of Pervomaysky and the Donguz test site are by the river.

The outcrops on the banks of the river (Donguz Formation) are of interest for palaeontology, and a number of discoveries have been made there.

References

Rivers of Orenburg Oblast